The Puerto Rico Aqueducts and Sewers Authority (PRASA; Spanish: Autoridad de Acueductos y Alcantarillados de Puerto Rico) is a water company and the government-owned corporation responsible for water quality, management, and supply in Puerto Rico, a US insular area. PRASA is the only entity authorized to conduct such business in Puerto Rico, effectively making it a government monopoly.

History 
The Puerto Rico Aqueducts and Sewers Authority was established by Law 40 of May 1, 1945.

In 1995 the agency was privatized under the administration of governor Pedro Rosselló until 2002 under governor Sila María Calderón when the contract ended.

The aftermath of Hurricane Maria left most of the island without water service for weeks. The agency announced in December, three months after the storm had passed, that the water service was restored to 90% of its clients. The authority was ordered by then governor Ricardo Rosselló to not charge for the service it was unable to provide during this period.

Gallery

See also
2015 Puerto Rican drought

References

External links
 www.acueductospr.com - official site 

Government-owned corporations of Puerto Rico
Water companies of the United States